Melittia auriplumia is a moth of the family Sesiidae. It is known from the Republic of the Congo and Uganda.

References

Sesiidae
Insects of Uganda
Moths of Africa
Moths described in 1910